The year 2023 in Japanese music.

Debuting

Debuting groups 
 Le Sserafim
 MiSaMo
 NCT Dream

Debuting soloists 
 Kaori Maeda
 Mayu Mineda
 Nako Misaki
 Shiori Tamai

Returning from hiatus

Returning groups

Returning soloists

Number-ones 

 Oricon number-one albums
 Oricon number-one singles
 Hot 100 number-one albums
 Hot 100 number-one singles

Awards 
 65th Japan Record Awards
 2023 MTV Video Music Awards Japan

Albums released

January

February

March

April

May

July

Disbanding and retiring artists

Disbanding 

 Bish
 For Tracy Hyde

Retiring

Going on hiatus

References 

2023 in Japanese music